The Rusty Razor is the debut studio album by Irish folk band Goats Don't Shave, released in 1992.
The album became a success after release, going Gold in Ireland.

History and reception
Goats Don't Shave began performing their Celtic folk-rock in between their day jobs shortly before the release of The Rusty Razor.

Critics hailed the album "a classic".

Track listing
All songs written by Pat Gallagher. 
 "Let The World Keep on Turning"
 "Las Vegas (In the Hills of Donegal)"
 "Eyes"
 "John Cherokee"
 "The Evictions"
 "Biddy from Sligo/Connaught Man's Rambles"
 "The Ranger"
 "Mary Mary"
 "Closing Time"
 "What She Means To Me"
 "Crooked Jack"
 "When You're Dead (You're Great)"

Personnel
Pat Gallagher – vocals, banjo, guitar
Jason Phibin – fiddle
Charlie Logue – keyboard
Declan Quinn – tinwhistle, mandolin
Gerry Coyle – bass guitar
Sean Doherty – acoustic guitar
Michael Gallagher – drums

References

1992 albums
Goats Don't Shave albums